These are the official results of the Men's 3000 metres steeplechase event at the 1976 Summer Olympics in Montreal. The competition was held on July 25, 1976, and on July 28, 1976.

Summary
The final was held on July 28, 1976. Contrary to many other Olympic middle- and long-distance Olympic finals, this final was fast from the start.  Finland's Tapio Kantanen, the defending Olympic bronze medalist from the 1972 Munich Summer Olympics, took the lead after the start.  About one lap later, Britain's Dennis Coates briefly moved into the lead, before Spain's Antonio Campos passed him.  Leading the 12-man field through 1,000 metres in 2:43.57, Campos kept up the fast pace.

With about 3.5 laps left, Poland's Bronislaw Malinowski took the lead.  Before 2,000 metres, which Malinowski passed in 5:29.07, the lead group was reduced to four men:  Malinowski, East Germany's Frank Baumgartl, Sweden's Anders Gärderud, and Finland's Kantanen.  West Germany's Michael Karst, the defending European Championships bronze medalist from Rome in 1974, rose to the fifth place, and tried unsuccessfully to pursue the lead group.  With about 600 metres left, Kantanen began to struggle, and he dropped decisively from the lead group early on the last back straight.  Around the same time, Gärderud sprinted past Malinowski - the exact reverse of what Malinowski had managed to do in Rome in 1974. Baumgartl fought hard with Malinowski for the second place, and was able to pass the Polish steeplechaser fully by early on the final bend.  After the last water barrier, Baumgartl launched his final kick, and closed the gap on Gärderud.

As the leading duo jumped to the last barrier, Baumgartl appeared to be in a slight lead.  However, the East German steeplechaser timed his last jump a bit too late, hitting the final barrier with his right knee.  As Baumgartl fell to the track, Gärderud was able to sprint into a wider lead over Malinowski, who had to jump over the fallen East German.  Although Kantanen saw Baumgartl's fall, he was at least ten metres too far to pass the East German, who very quickly got up, and sprinted remarkably quickly towards the finish line.  All the top four runners set their personal and national records, while Gärderud set also the world, Olympic, European, and Nordic (or Scandinavian) record in this distance.  Gärderud's Olympic record would last until 1988, when Kenya's Julius Kariuki broke it in the Seoul Summer Olympics.

However, Kariuki's countryman Henry Rono set a new world record at this distance already in 1978 in Seattle.  (Hannus, Matti, The Montreal Olympic Book, Helsinki, Finland, 1976;

Records
Prior to the 1976 Summer Olympics, the existing world and Olympic records were as follows:

The following new world and Olympic records were set during this competition: 

The following national records were established during the competition:

Results

Heats
Held on 25 July 1976. Note: Top six in each heat (Q) advanced to the final.

Heat 1

Heat 2

Final

References

External links
Event overview at Olympedia.org

Athletics at the 1976 Summer Olympics
1976
Men's events at the 1976 Summer Olympics